Husøy Church is a parish church of the Church of Norway in Solund Municipality in Vestland county, Norway. It is located in the village of Kolgrov, on the western coast of the island of Ytre Sula. It is one of the three churches for the Solund parish which is part of the Nordhordland prosti (deanery) in the Diocese of Bjørgvin. The white, wooden church was built in a long church design in 1896 using plans drawn up by the architect Peter Andersen. The church seats about 174 people.

History
The earliest existing historical records of the church date back to the year 1350, but it was not new that year. The first church was a wooden stave church  that was located on the island of Utvær, and at that time, it was known as the Utvær kapell (chapel). The church was likely built during the 12th century. It was an annex chapel within the great parish of Evindvig. There were only a few services per year at that chapel, and it was difficult to get to during the winter. The chapel was dedicated to St. Clement, the patron saint of mariners. Legend has it that King Harald Hardråde gathered his fleet at Utvær before sailing to attack England in 1066. This area was also one of the common meeting place for sailors heading to Iceland and other islands. The weather on Utvær was harsh and the chapel sat on a high point, very visible on the relatively flat, rocky islands. There are reports of the roof being blown off the chapel and the siding being repaired. In 1666 or 1667, some Scottish seafarers raided and plundered the chapel and broke some windows. Reports from 1686 tell that Utvær chapel had a nave that measured  and a square choir that measured  on each side. It was also mentioned that the church was in poor condition and rarely used anymore. The last service held at Utvær was on 1 August 1717. In 1723, the old chapel was torn down.

The new chapel was built in the fall of 1717 or the spring of 1718 on the small island of Husøy, just west of the large island of Ytre Sula. The new church could seat about 120 people. The church site was not the greatest. By 1755, the church records show that the wooden beams supporting the floor were already rotting. Also, there was very little soil on the rocky island, so it was very difficult to bury coffins in the churchyard. In 1787, the church was repaired with the hopes that it would last another 100 years. During the 1800s, the area had increased in population so that the congregation was nearly 500 people.

In 1888, Husøy was split out from the vast Eivindvig prestegjeld, becoming a parish of its own. This meant that Husøy Church was the only church to serve the new parish, and it was located in the far western part of the municipality on a small island, so it was rather difficult to get to. It was eventually decided to move the church again. It was moved to the village of Kolgrov on the western coast of Ytre Sula island. The church was designed by Peter Andersen and the lead builder was Peter Gabrielsen. Construction of the new building began in the spring of 1896. The new church was consecrated on 15 October 1896. When the new church was completed, the old church on Husøy was sold and torn down. The materials were used to build a prayer house in Leirvåg in Lindås.

See also
List of churches in Bjørgvin

References

Solund
Churches in Vestland
Long churches in Norway
Wooden churches in Norway
19th-century Church of Norway church buildings
Churches completed in 1896
12th-century establishments in Norway